The Ivor Novello Awards are held annually since 1956 by the Ivors Academy, formerly the British Academy of Songwriters, Composers and Authors, to recognize the excellence in songwriting and composing. The following list consists of all the winners and nominees of the awards by year, the winners are listed first and in bold followed by the nominees if present.

The awards and/or nominations are received by the songwriters of the nominated work, not the performers, unless they also have songwriting credits.

1950s
1956

The 1st Ivor Novello Awards were presented on March 11, 1956, at the Theatre Royal, Drury Lane, London.

1957

The 2nd Ivor Novello Awards were presented on April 8, 1957.

1958

The 3rd Ivor Novello Awards were presented in 1958.

1959

The 4th Ivor Novello Awards were presented at the BBC Television Theatre, London on May 25, 1959.

1960s

1960
The 5th Ivor Novello Awards were broadcast on BBC Television on June 6, 1960.

1961

The 6th Ivor Novello Awards were presented on May 20, 1961.

1962

The 7th Ivor Novello Awards were broadcast on BBC Television on May 13, 1962.

1963

The 8th Ivor Novello Awards were broadcast on BBC Television on May 4, 1963.

1964

The 9th Ivor Novello Awards were presented in 1964.

1965

The 10th Ivor Novello Awards took place on July 13, 1965, at the Savoy Hotel, London.

1966

The 11th Ivor Novello Awards were held the Hammersmith Palais, London.

1967

The 12th Ivor Novello Awards were held at the Lyceum Ballroom, London. They were broadcast on BBC radio service Light Programme on March 27, 1967.

1968

The 13th Ivor Novello Awards were presented in 1968.

1969

The 14th Ivor Novello Awards were presented on May 22, 1969.

References

External links

 Ivor Awards archive